The following is a list of people executed by the U.S. state of Arkansas since 1976, when the Supreme Court reinstated the death penalty in the United States.

31 people have been executed in Arkansas since 1976: 30 males and 1 female (Christina Marie Riggs). All but John Swindler (who was executed by electric chair) were executed by lethal injection. All were executed for the crime of murder.

See also 
 Capital punishment in Arkansas
 Capital punishment in the United States

Notes 


References 

Arkansas
Arkansas
Executions
 
Execution
Male murderers